Herschel Sims (born September 17, 1991) is a former American football running back who played for the ACU Wildcats. He previously played at Oklahoma State, as well as Lamar University. Sims is currently a graduate assistant football coach at the University of North Texas.<ref>{{cite web|url=http://www.meangreensports.com/sports/m-footbl/mtt/herschel_sims_1038419.html|website=MeanGreenSports.com|title="/>

High school
Sims began high school football with the Abilene High School Eagles, who won the 2009 5A State Championship (Texas), against the Katy High School Tigers. He began playing for the Oklahoma State Cowboys in the 2011 season.  Sporting News ranked him  as the number 14 best college recruit.  Rivals.com said that he was the fourth best back in the country.  In 2010, part of Sims' final high school football season was profiled on the MTV documentary series, World of Jenks.  He played in the 2011 U.S. Army All-American Bowl. 

The film, Under the Stadium Lights, focuses on the 2009 Abilene High Eagles 2009 season in which Sims is a main character portrayed by Acoryé White. The film stars Milo Gibson & Laurence Fishburne as Chad Mitchell & Harold Christian. Sims was not active in the film and provided very little support to the actors involved, the film is based on the novel 'Brother's Keeper' by Chad Mitchell & Al Pickett.

Recruiting
One of the most sought after signatures in the 2010 class Sims pledged early to Oklahoma State, but was frequently listed as a soft commitment.  Texas A&M and TCU also recruited him, but Sims fended them off only to be reportedly mulling a late offer from Auburn. However, he stuck to his original commitment and signed with Oklahoma State.

 Scout ranked him No. 5 among America's backs and as the No. 6 player in Texas.
 Ranked by Rivals.com as the second best all-purpose running back in the country, the No. 8 player in Texas and No. 73 overall recruit in America
 First-team Texas Super Team by Texas Football.
 First-team Associated Press all-stater and as a junior was the Texas 5A offensive player of the year.
 A member of the SuperPrep's national Elite 50, checking in at No. 39
 US Army All-American

Oklahoma State
Reported in June 2011 to summer training camp at 208 pounds.

Played his first collegiate game against Kansas.  Sims scored his first touchdown against the Jayhawks as well. He had two 100-yard games against Baylor and Texas Tech.   He racked up 242 yards on just 31 carries, an average of nearly 7.8 yards per carry.

Sims has been accused of stealing $700 from a teammate. He was dismissed from the team on June 1, 2012. On June 5, 2012, he was charged with two felony counts of second-degree forgery.

References

Living people
1991 births
American football running backs
Oklahoma State Cowboys football players
Lamar Cardinals football players
Abilene Christian Wildcats football players
Sportspeople from Abilene, Texas
Players of American football from Texas